8-Bit Operators: The Music of Kraftwerk was released  in 2007 by the group 8-Bit Operators  on Kraftwerk's US label Astralwerks and EMI Records worldwide. It features cover versions of Kraftwerk songs by several prominent chiptune artists. 

In March 2007, the CD release reached as high as number 1 on the CMJ RPM (North American college Electronic) charts.

Background
Inspiration for the project as quoted by Jeremy Kolosine (credited as Executive Producer of the release, and noted founder of the early 80's electronic group Futurisk and chipmusic band Receptors.)

This Kraftwerk covers compilation was somewhat unusual in the fact that Kraftwerk's Ralf Hütter selected the final track line-up.  

In a subsequent interview, when asked about the 8-Bit Operators release, Ralf Hütter responded:

CD Track listing

Vinyl
A vinyl 12-inch single version was released on 24 February 2007 as a precursor to the full-length CD, and reached as high as number 17 on the Billboard magazine Hot Dance Singles Sales Chart. 

Side A of the vinyl consisted of  8-Bit Operators' "Pocket Calculator (Megamix)" version by Glomag (featuring 0x7f, Bit Shifter, Bubblyfish, firestARTer, Hey Kid Nice Robot, Ladybug, M-.-n, Nullsleep, Psilodump, Random, Sidabitball, and David E Sugar).

Side B was an alternate cover of Kraftwerk's "The Robots" by the Los Angeles chipmusic rap group 8-Bit.

References

2007 debut albums
Astralwerks compilation albums
Tribute albums
Kraftwerk
Electronic compilation albums